Barra do Garças Airport  is the airport serving Barra do Garças, Brazil.

Airlines and destinations

Access

See also

List of airports in Brazil

References

External links

Airports in Mato Grosso